Squitty Bay Provincial Park is a provincial park in British Columbia, Canada, located on Lasqueti Island in the Northern Gulf Islands of the Strait of Georgia region.

References

External links
Map BC Parks

Provincial Parks of the Gulf Islands
Provincial parks of British Columbia
Protected areas established in 1988
1988 establishments in British Columbia